The Brothers of Destruction were a professional wrestling tag team in WWE composed of storyline half-brothers The Undertaker and Kane.

With more deep-seated drama and dysfunction than other WWE tag team combinations, their relationship/brotherhood was furnished with an elaborately dark and disturbed domestic backstory. In what became a fickle WWE sibling relationship with Paul Bearer (later learned to be Kane's father) only adding to the pendulum and complexities, The Undertaker and Kane went back and forth from one extreme to the other: alternatively feuding to barbaric lengths and yet teaming together as The Brothers of Destruction from 1997 to 2020 (The Undertaker's retirement).

As the Brothers of Destruction, they won three tag team championships (two WWF Tag Team Championships and one WCW Tag Team Championship). Their on-again, off-again feuding was typically rooted in the harboring of unresolved, harsh feelings from the arson incident dating back to their youth.

Fictional backstory

During The Undertaker's teens, he intentionally committed an arson murder, burning down his parents' family funeral home, in the process, killing them as well as the younger brother—or so The Undertaker thought. Bearer, who oblivious to The Undertaker at the time was present during the fire, hid Kane in a mental asylum during the rest of Kane's youth into adulthood. Unbeknownst to The Undertaker until spring 1998, his late mother had an affair with Bearer and, as a result, gave birth to Kane (therefore making Kane his half-brother). In the fall of 1998, The Undertaker admitted to setting the fire that scarred Kane's face, and, in the same process, killed their mother and The Undertaker's father. The Undertaker reasoned that he had always known that Kane was the weaker and worthless of their mother's children.

While hiding his son away for years and apparently keeping this information confidential, Bearer, in the meantime, joined the World Wrestling Federation and formed an alliance with The Undertaker. Bearer stood by his side for six years before eventually turning on him at SummerSlam 96. After suffering repeated acts of retaliatory mistreatment at the hands of Undertaker, who was filled with rancor and bitterness over the betrayal incident, Bearer opted to exact vengeance of his own with an ultimatum: to either allow him to once again take over Undertaker as manager now that he had won the WWF Championship or deal with the disclosure of his darkest secret. Feeling he had no choice in the matter, The Undertaker eventually obliged Bearer and became his protégé, though not like old times. While "managing" Undertaker this time around, Bearer took to abrasively overbearing and harassing behaviors towards him at every turn. At numerous points in which Undertaker attempted to take attitude, disobey, or even defend himself, Bearer would subjugate him by threatening exposure of the dark secret. Eventually, Undertaker lost his patience and refused to allow Bearer to manage him any longer, leading to Bearer's exposure of the secret. At this point in time, The Undertaker denied the charges of committing the arson murders, claiming his younger brother, a "pyromaniac", was the culprit and due to the incident couldn't possibly even be alive (note that Undertaker would reveal himself as the intentional arsonist a year later). Bearer accused The Undertaker of not only being a murderer but a liar, while The Undertaker continued to deny the charges. Kane had been scarred by the fire—and to conceal Jacobs' identity—the character wore a mask, sported long hair, and wore red and black ring attire that almost covered his entire body.

History

Kane's debut (1997–1998) 
After The Undertaker won the WWF Championship at WrestleMania 13, he started a feud with Mankind, managed by his former manager Paul Bearer. The Bearer/Undertaker feud escalated at April's Revenge of the 'Taker: In Your House when The Undertaker launched a fireball into the face of his former manager. During the following weeks, Bearer threatened the exposure of The Undertaker's "deepest, darkest secret". At Badd Blood: In Your House, Kane made his debut and interfered during the Hell in a Cell match between The Undertaker and Shawn Michaels.

During the following months, Undertaker refused to wrestle with Kane, while Kane attacked and humiliated The Undertaker on several occasions. He cost Undertaker a casket match against WWF Champion Shawn Michaels at the 1998 Royal Rumble and, after the match, Kane and Bearer locked Undertaker in the casket and set it ablaze. After 2 months of absence, The Undertaker agreed to face Kane at WrestleMania XIV, which Undertaker won after hitting Kane with three tombstone piledrivers. They met once again in the first-ever Inferno match (Kane's signature match) at Unforgiven: In Your House, which again Undertaker won.

At King of the Ring 1998, Kane and the WWF Champion Steve Austin in a First Blood match. During the match, Undertaker interfered with a steel chair and nailed Austin with the chair, which helped Kane to win the championship. Undertaker formed a partnership with Kane after he later revealed that he intentionally attacked Austin because he didn't want his brother to be burned. Undertaker started a rivalry with Steve Austin, who later regained the WWF title from Kane while Kane and Mankind won the WWF Tag Team Championship. At Fully Loaded: In Your House, the duo were forced to team up together and defeat Kane and Mankind to win the titles.

Collusion and betrayal, Undertaker's arson confession and feuding (1998–1999)
After Austin and Undertaker dropped the titles back to Kane and Mankind, Undertaker and Kane began to work as allies, facing the WWF Champion Steve Austin at Breakdown: In Your House in a triple threat match. Per stipulations, Undertaker and Kane were forbidden from pinning each other, making it a de facto handicap match. At the end of the title match, they pinned Austin at the same time. The title was vacated since there was no clear winner, and both faced each other at Judgment Day: In Your House with Austin as the special referee. Undertaker turned heel during the match as he betrayed Kane to side with Paul Bearer. The match ended in a no contest as Austin attacked Undertaker. Their feud continued when Undertaker faced Austin at Rock Bottom: In Your House in a Buried Alive match; during the match, Kane interfered and attacked Undertaker, thus helping Austin get the win. They separated from each other and went on their own.

In early 1999, with Kane now a member of The Corporation and Undertaker now the leader of the Ministry of Darkness, they faced each other in their second Inferno match, which Undertaker once again won. In the summer of 1999, The Undertaker's Ministry of Darkness was beginning to fade away, while Kane was in a tag team with X-Pac, with whom he won the WWF Tag Team Championship twice. The Undertaker attempted to reunite the Brothers of Destruction, but Kane made the ultimate decision to remain in his team with X-Pac after learning the Undertaker only wanted to use him. Shortly after, Undertaker would form The Unholy Alliance with Big Show, with whom he won the WWF Tag Team Championship twice, to feud with Kane and X-Pac. The Undertaker eventually was injured in the fall of 1999, with Kane going his own way again.

Tag team division dominance (2000–2001) 
The Undertaker and Kane reunited again in the summer of 2000. At this time, The Undertaker had transformed into the "American Badass" biker identity instead of the horror-themed Deadman identity he portrayed previously. He and Kane challenged Tag Team Champions Edge and Christian for the tag titles on an episode of Raw is War, but they were disqualified, so they didn't win the titles. On the August 14 episode of Raw is War, Undertaker faced Chris Benoit in a match, where Kane turned on Undertaker by chokeslamming him through the ring, and the two feuded with each other again. This culminated in a match at SummerSlam, which resulted in a no contest when Undertaker unmasked Kane, causing him to flee the ring.

At the Royal Rumble in 2001, Kane and Undertaker teamed up eliminating most of the field in the Royal Rumble match; Kane entered number 6 and finished second eliminating 11 wrestlers, while Undertaker came in at number 25 and came sixth after being eliminated by Rikishi. The two reunited later that same month, and on the February 1 episode of SmackDown!, they defeated Rikishi and Haku in a First Blood match. They got a shot at the tag titles at No Way Out, facing the champions The Dudley Boyz (Bubba Ray and D-Von) and Edge and Christian in a tables match, but lost when Rikishi and Haku interfered. At WrestleMania X-Seven, Kane defeated Raven and Big Show to win the WWF Hardcore Championship, and The Undertaker defeated Triple H.

The Undertaker and Kane started focusing on then-Intercontinental Champion Triple H, who would soon make a surprise alliance with WWF Champion Stone Cold Steve Austin known as Two-Man Power Trip. They were granted an opportunity to face Austin and Triple H at Backlash, if they could defeat Edge and Christian in a no-disqualification match for the titles. On April 19 episode of SmackDown!, Undertaker and Kane defeated Edge and Christian to win their first WWF Tag Team Championship as a team, despite interference from Austin and Triple H. As a result of winning the titles, Brothers of Destruction earned the right to face Steve Austin and Triple H. At Backlash, all major titles were on the line but despite that, Triple H pinned Kane after using a sledgehammer, thus making him and Austin the new WWF Tag Team Champions as well as the WWF Intercontinental Champion and WWF Champion, respectively.

With Kane injured, The Undertaker began targeting Steve Austin and his WWF Championship. On an episode of Raw is War, Undertaker was told by police officers that his wife Sara had been involved in a car accident; The Undertaker arrived home, only to find out that it was all a set-up by Austin. At Judgment Day, Kane defeated Triple H to win the WWF Intercontinental Championship in a chain match, despite interference from Austin. Later that night, Triple H interfered in the Undertaker's WWF Championship match, using his sledgehammer, allowing Austin to pin The Undertaker and retain his championship.

Diamond Dallas Page was the Undertaker's next target; Page wanted to become a big star like the Undertaker, and started a feud with him, taking The Undertaker's slogan, "I'll make you famous" quite figuratively. The basis of this feud involved Page stalking Undertaker's wife Sara, hoping to get the Undertaker's attention. On the August 9 episode of SmackDown!, the Brothers of Destruction defeated The Natural Born Thrillers (Chuck Palumbo and Sean O'Haire) to win the WCW Tag Team Championship. At SummerSlam, The Undertaker and Kane defeated Diamond Dallas Page and Kanyon in a steel cage match to win their second WWF Tag Team Championship and retain the WCW Tag Team Championship, thus briefly unifying the two titles.

The Brothers of Destruction began a feud with KroniK (Brian Adams and Bryan Clark), who were brought to WWF by Stevie Richards. Richards wanted revenge on the Undertaker for what happened to him on the April 26, 2001 episode of SmackDown!, when Undertaker faced Richards' Right to Censor stable in a 4-on-1 handicap match, causing the stable to disband. On the September 17 episode of Raw is War, Kane and Undertaker lost the WWF Tag Team Championship to The Dudley Boyz after KroniK interfered. At Unforgiven, they successfully defended their WCW tag titles against KroniK, before losing them to Booker T and Test on the following episode of SmackDown!. They continued on as a team representing the WWF side through to the end of the Alliance Invasion angle, including their participation at Invasion and Survivor Series, after which The Undertaker immediately turned heel once more and the two did not interact with each other for a long while.

Sporadic encounters (2002–2005) 
The duo first appeared together in 2002's WWF draft, standing right next to each other when Undertaker was drafted to the Raw brand. The duo next appeared together during the first few moments of No Mercy as they both respectively had title matches that night, with Undertaker challenging Brock Lesnar for the WWE Championship inside Hell in a Cell and Kane defending his Intercontinental Championship in a unification match against Triple H for the World Heavyweight Championship. They next teamed up again unofficially at the Royal Rumble in 2003, but Undertaker turned on Kane during the Royal Rumble match and eliminated him. Later that year at the Survivor Series, an unmasked and heel Kane interfered in the Buried Alive match between The Undertaker and Mr. McMahon, costing Undertaker the match. Kane would go on to say that Undertaker was buried forever, claiming he did it because his brother was no longer a monster. The two would end the feud with a match at WrestleMania XX in 2004, in which The Undertaker returned to his "Deadman" identity, and defeated his half-brother Kane.

The demonic duo had a short run-in with each other in 2005; at the Royal Rumble, Undertaker was in a scheduled match against the then-heel Heidenreich in a casket match. Before the match, Gene Snitsky, who was in a feud with the then-face gimmick Kane, told Heidenreich he would help him that night. Due to the interference, Heidenreich was positioned to win. However, when the casket was asked to be opened, Kane emerged from the casket coming to his aid, attacked, and battled Snitsky out of the arena, allowing his brother, The Undertaker to defeat Heidenreich and gain the victory. Originally, those plans were for this to lead up to a tag team match at WrestleMania 21, but was scrapped when The Undertaker instead decided to take on Randy Orton, and Kane would compete in the Money in the Bank ladder match.

The last time Kane and the Undertaker would meet in 2005 was during an interpromotional match where neither of the men from Raw or SmackDown! were involved. While Kane, who was helping his partner Big Show against Rey Mysterio, pretended to leave when Undertaker entered the arena, he would inevitably receive a chokeslam from Undertaker after a failed sneak attack. Notably, both brothers were faces at the time, however Kane was a member of the Raw brand and Undertaker was a member of the SmackDown! brand. Because the match was held on SmackDown! (and the SmackDown! brand was portrayed more favorably in that year's brand warfare storyline), Kane and Big Show were portrayed as tweeners without ever officially turning in that direction.

Brothers of Destruction reunions (2006–2010) 

The return of the Brothers of Destruction was announced on October 27, 2006 episode of SmackDown!. Montel Vontavious Porter (MVP) interfered with Kane's match against Mr. Kennedy, helping Kennedy beat down on him. As a result of the interference, General Manager Theodore Long scheduled a tag team match pitting the Brothers of Destruction against Kennedy and MVP. The next week on SmackDown!, the Brothers of Destruction reunited for the first time as a tag team in five years and gathered three wins over MVP and Kennedy in that one night. The first two wins were made by countout, and disqualification at which point General Manager Theodore Long twice came out and restarted the match with no disqualifications or countouts. Finally, the brothers hit simultaneous chokeslams, and Undertaker finished with a Tombstone Piledriver to Mr. Kennedy.

The brothers continued their rivalry with their individual opponents before reuniting for a rematch on the last SmackDown! before Armageddon. This time, the match would go to a double disqualification as Kennedy threatened to run over Kane with a hearse parked ringside. The Undertaker, who had run off MVP, emerged in the passenger seat as his gong tolled and the lights went out, thus scaring Kennedy out of the vehicle. At Armageddon, Undertaker defeated Kennedy in a Last Ride match, which was why the hearse had been at ringside for the last two weeks, and Kane defeated MVP earlier in an inferno match. The next week on SmackDown!, the Brothers would reunite once again, defeating King Booker and Finlay, before parting ways as Kane began a rivalry with The Great Khali while Undertaker successfully pursued the World Heavyweight Championship at WrestleMania 23.

On October 12, 2007 episode of SmackDown!, the Brothers of Destruction reunited for the first time in 2007, defeating then WWE Tag Team Champions MVP and Matt Hardy in a non-title match. The Brothers of Destruction reunited for the first time in 2008 on the February 1, 2008 episode of SmackDown, defeating Big Daddy V and Mark Henry by submission. At WrestleMania XXIV, after Kane won a well-earned 24-man Battle Royal and used a sneak attack in gaining the second ever WrestleMania record for the fastest pin later that night, and Undertaker won the Elimination Chamber match earning his No.1 Contender shot at No Way Out, both brothers became world champions: with Kane winning the ECW Championship from Chavo Guerrero, and the Undertaker winning the World Heavyweight Championship from Edge.

On the April 4, 2008 episode of SmackDown, Undertaker and Kane faced each other for the first time since WrestleMania XX. The match finished with no decision as "La Familia" (Edge, Chavo Guerrero, and Curt Hawkins and Zack Ryder) interfered. In tandem, however, Kane and Undertaker delivered a Chokeslam and Tombstone Piledriver to Chavo and Edge respectively. The Brothers of Destruction also made an appearance when ECW traveled to London, England on April 15, 2008, facing then WWE Tag Team Champions John Morrison and The Miz who also fell victim to tandem chokeslams. On the April 21, 2008 episode of Raw, the Brothers of Destruction teamed with John Cena and Triple H to take on the team of John "Bradshaw" Layfield (JBL), Chavo Guerrero, and the one night only reunion of Rated-RKO (Edge and Randy Orton) in a losing effort, after Edge hit Kane with a spear. On the November 13, 2009 episode of SmackDown, after his match with Chris Jericho which was ended after interference from Jericho's partner Big Show, Kane came to the aid of his "brother" to chase off "Jeri-Show". The Brothers of Destruction would reunite on the November 20 episode to face the Jeri-Show, but the match ended in no contest, and Jericho subsequently fled the ring during the match after pilfering the Undertaker's championship belt.

Final sibling rivalry feud: Kane's closure and victories (late 2009–2010)
On the June 4 episode of SmackDown, SmackDown General Manager Theodore Long announced that The Undertaker was found in a vegetative state by Kane, who vowed to out the identity of Undertaker's attacker, and for weeks he accused and interrogated other superstars. At Money in the Bank, Kane won the Money in the Bank ladder match to win a World Heavyweight Championship title shot any time, anywhere. Later that night, Kane chased off one of The Undertaker's potential attackers, Jack Swagger, who was attacking Rey Mysterio. Kane then returned to cash in his Money in the Bank contract to win the World Heavyweight Championship. Kane would then claim that Rey Mysterio was The Undertaker's attacker, although Mysterio denied it. At SummerSlam, Kane defended his championship against Mysterio, during which The Undertaker returned to confront Kane and Rey Mysterio. Undertaker, however, was tombstoned by Kane, who was revealed to be the Undertaker's attacker the entire time, Thus resulted in a feud between the two.

Kane and Undertaker met at Night of Champions, which Undertaker lost. Kane had seemingly grew stronger than his older half-brother (seemingly resolving previously unfinished business from their youth when The Undertaker set Kane on fire as teenagers, later reasoning that it was because Kane was "too weak"). In an attempt to regain momentum over Kane, The Undertaker was boosted by the return of his former manager/Kane's father, Paul Bearer (who hadn't been seen in years, since June 2004 when The Undertaker betrayed Bearer by drowning him in a crypt of cement, seemingly paying Bearer back for his unforgettable act of betrayal at SummerSlam 1996 and following acts of introducing Kane).

With Bearer by The Undertaker's side like old times, the two brothers squared off again at the Hell in a Cell pay-per-view in a Hell in a Cell match for the World Heavyweight Championship. Bearer, however, betrayed The Undertaker by blinding him with the urn, allowing Kane to chokeslam The Undertaker for the victory (repaying Undertaker for the Concrete Crypt burial at The Great American Bash). The feud culminated in what would be the brothers' final one-on-one match, a Buried Alive match at Bragging Rights, in which The Undertaker once again lost and in his own specialty match, this time resulting in part from interference by The Nexus.

Brief reunions (2012–2020) 

On July 23, 2012 during Raw 1000, the Brothers of Destruction reunited against Jinder Mahal, Curt Hawkins, Tyler Reks, Hunico, Camacho and Drew McIntyre when they were planning to attack Kane. The Undertaker and Kane were once again reunited on the March 11, 2013 episode of Raw following the real-life death of Paul Bearer, when they paid a final tribute to Paul Bearer by standing on the ramp and doing their signature arm pose together to a graphic of Paul Bearer on the titantron. On the April 8, 2013 episode of Raw, Undertaker had a match with  Kane and his Team Hell No tag partner Daniel Bryan against The Shield. At Survivor Series 2015, The Brothers of Destruction defeated Wyatt and Harper in a tag team match. They would have another match at Crown Jewel against D-Generation X (Triple H and Shawn Michaels), but they were defeated. At Survivor Series 2020, Kane alongside other Superstars and Legends, returned for The Undertaker’s retirement ceremony. The Undertaker, wearing his trademark mortician trench coat and stetson hat, then made an appearance at the conclusion of the Survivor Series event on November 22, which commemorated thirty years since his WWE debut, where he reiterated that his career was over, giving an emotional farewell speech which ended in typical Undertaker fashion: "My time has come to let The Undertaker Rest in Peace." With The Undertaker having retired from in-ring competition in November 2020, Crown Jewel marked the final time Kane and The Undertaker would team up together as a tag team.

WWE Hall of Fame (2021–2022)
In the aftermath of Undertaker's retirement from the WWE, the following year, he announced that Kane would be inducted into the WWE Hall of Fame Class of 2021 via The Bump, and Undertaker himself was announced that he too would be inducted into Class of 2022 and he made his entrances on both nights at WrestleMania 38.

Championships and accomplishments 

 CBS Sports
 Worst Angle of the Year (2018) 
 Pro Wrestling Illustrated
 Manager of the Year (1998) – Paul Bearer
 World Wrestling Federation/WWE
 WWF Hardcore Championship (1 time) – Kane
 WWF Intercontinental Championship (1 time) – Kane
 WWF Tag Team Championship (2 times)
 WCW Tag Team Championship (1 time)1
 Wrestling Observer Newsletter
 Worst Worked Match of the Year (2001) vs. KroniK at Unforgiven
 Worst Worked Match of the Year (2018) vs. D-Generation X at Crown Jewel

1 The Brothers of Destruction won title during The Invasion and also held the WWF Tag Team Championship at the same time, thus briefly unifying the two championships, however they defended and lost each title on separate occasions.

References

External links 

 
 

WWE teams and stables
WWE World Tag Team Champions
Professional wrestling rivalries
The Undertaker